Wesley College of Science (founded as Wesley College on November 5, 1905) is a government controlled, co-educational, senior secondary school located in Ibadan, Oyo State. The school was previously called "Wesley College", a teacher training institution that churned out the likes of famous politician, elder statesman of repute, and the First Western Premier in the First Republic, Chief Obafemi Awolowo. Currently known as Wesley College of Science, it educates senior secondary school science students in preparation for Senior School Certificate Examinations. According to Naij.com, it is the 6th oldest secondary school in Nigeria.

Notable alumni
 Obafemi Awolowo
 Tai Solarin
 Olaniwun Ajayi, chieftain of Afenifere
 Akinwunmi Isola
 Frederick Odutola
 Chief Peter Olakeinde Sogbesan
 Dibu Ojerinde
 HRH Abraham Olayinka Okupe, Alaperu of Iperu (1936–76).
 Goke Bajowa
 Professor Adegoke Olubummo
 Chief Oladejo Okediji
 General Lamidi Adeosun
 Gbenga Ogunbowale
 Funmi Obisesan
 Mubarak Damilare Tiamiyu
 Senator Luke Tewogbola Olamijulo

Notes and references

Educational institutions established in 1905
Secondary schools in Nigeria
1905 establishments in the British Empire
Government schools in Nigeria